Márcio Luiz Silva Lopes Santos Souza or simply Márcio (born January 24, 1981, in Aracaju), is a former Brazilian football goalkeeper.

Titles 

Bahia

 Bahia State League: 2002
 Northeast Cup: 2002

Atlético Goianiense

 Goiás State League: 2007, 2010
 Brazilian Série C: 2008

See also 
 List of goalscoring goalkeepers

References

External links 
 Márcio at ZeroZero
 Profile at Globo Esporte's Futpedia

1981 births
Living people
Brazilian footballers
Esporte Clube Bahia players
Fortaleza Esporte Clube players
Atlético Clube Goianiense players
Goiás Esporte Clube players
Campeonato Brasileiro Série A players
Association football goalkeepers
People from Aracaju
Sportspeople from Sergipe